The Solicitor-General of Grenada is a law officer of the government for Grenada, subordinate to the Attorney-General of Grenada. The office is one of the members of the government. The Solicitor General could also be a member of the General Assembly.

List of Solicitors-General of Grenada

1771–1781 John Stanley
1774–1779 Sir Ashton Warner Byam. (appointed 9 June 1774, then Attorney-General 1783–1789)
1774 Thomas Baker  (previously Attorney General)
1842 William Snagg  (appointed 23 February 1842, later Governor)
1960–1979 Nolan Jacobs 
 Dwight Horsford (2013–2018)
 Dia Forrester (8 April 2019 – 2020)
Karen Reid-Ballantyne (1 April 2021–Present)

References

Grenada
Political office-holders in Grenada